Eugenio Cecconi (September 8, 1842 – December 19, 1903) was an Italian painter. He is most noted for his paintings of hunting scenes and the Italian countryside, however his work also includes many representations of Oriental themes.

Early life
He was born in Livorno into a wealthy family. His father owned substantial lands around Livorno, and the rents were used not only to support his large family, but also to assist those who worked towards a unified Italy. For his support of the rebels, Eugenio's father was forced into exile, taking refuge in the countryside. The boy, Eugenio, acquired his love of nature and animals during this period and developed a passion for hunting.

Education and career

He first studied jurisprudence at the University of Pisa, then entered a course of study under the sculptor Fazzi from Lucca, a pupil of Carlo Markò the elder. He moved to Florence to practice law with Leopoldo Cempini, but began to attend courses of painting at the Academy under Enrico Pollastrini. Following his father's death in 1864 he abandoned law, and concentrated on painting. His early work concentrated on portraits of customers, painted inside his studio. However, when the weather was good, he would take to the hills and paint scenes from the countryside.

In 1866, he volunteered with other Tuscan artists to fight in the wars of Italian Independence. After that campaign, he opened a studio in Livorno adjacent to Adolfo Belimbau. By the summer of that year, Diego Martelli hosted him to Castiglioncello: where he works alongside Boldini, Bechi, and Abbati. In 1869, he considered  himself sufficient as a painter, and began to exhibit some of his works at the Promotrice di Turin. Encouraged by friends and other painters, he exhibited again in 1872 at the second National Exhibition of Milan. The 1872 exhibition was a turning point in his career, as his work gained considerable public and critical attention.

In 1873, he moved to Ceppato, near Lari, painting hunting scenes. He became friends with Francesco Gioli and Corcos. In 1875, he travelled to Tunisia with Belimbau. Upon returning to Tuscany, he settled in Torre del Lago, the hamlet which was now a locus for artistic pilgrimages due to the presence of the Villa of Puccini. Following his sojourn in Tunisia, he became interested in Oriental scenes.  His experience also changed his perceptions of colour and light.

In 1880 he exhibited Cenciaiole Livornesi and exhibited at the International Exposition of Modern Paintings at the società Donatello. In 1881-1888, he exhibited at Florence, Rome, Milan, Bologna, and Turin.

He died in Florence in 1903.

Work

Cecconi worked in oils, pencil and watercolor drawings, tempers, engravings and also with fresco. His early work feature portraits and scenes of the Italian countryside. His later works include Oriental themes. He is most noted for his hunting scenes featuring hunting dogs.

Select list of paintings
 Hunted Rally
 Maremmano Braccaiolo
 Hunters' Park
 Hunters on the Seashore
 Hunting in the Fucecchio Padule
 Hunting Appointment
 Deer Death
 Hound Dogs
 Wild Boar
 Cenciaiole Livornesi 1880
 Paesaggio Invernale, 1885 
 Volto di Donna Araba,

References

Further reading
 Giampaolo Daddi, Eugenio Cecconi, Editore Stefanoni di Lecco.1973

External links

 Biography @ De Artibus
 More works by Cecconi @ ArtNet

1842 births
1903 deaths
People from Livorno
19th-century Italian painters
20th-century Italian painters
Painters from Florence
Italian male painters
Orientalist painters
Accademia di Belle Arti di Firenze alumni
19th-century Italian male artists
20th-century Italian male artists